José Antonio Pardo Lucas (born 21 April 1988) is a Spanish professional footballer who plays as a central defender for CD Badajoz.

Club career
Born in Valencia, Pardo played youth football with local Valencia CF and Villarreal CF, making his senior debuts with the latter's C-team. He played his first seasons in the lower leagues and his native region, representing Alicante CF B, Villajoyosa CF and Valencia CF Mestalla.

In August 2012, Pardo joined Recreativo de Huelva in a two-year deal. He made his second division debut on 18 November, being one of two team players sent off in a 2–5 home loss against CE Sabadell FC.

On 29 July 2013 Pardo signed with Real Oviedo, in the third level. On 17 July of the following year he moved to fellow league team Hércules CF, but halfway through the season he switched again to join La Hoya Lorca CF.

Pardo moved to another team in the same division on 30 June 2016, Mérida AD. A year later, he signed for their neighbours Extremadura UD, where he scored the only goal of the aggregate win over FC Cartagena in the June 2018 playoffs to achieve their first promotion to the second level.

Pardo subsequently resumed his career in the third division, representing UD Ibiza (also helping in a promotion to the second tier) and CD Badajoz.

References

External links

1988 births
Living people
Footballers from Valencia (city)
Spanish footballers
Association football defenders
Segunda División players
Segunda División B players
Primera Federación players
Tercera División players
Villarreal CF C players
Villajoyosa CF footballers
Valencia CF Mestalla footballers
Recreativo de Huelva players
Real Oviedo players
Hércules CF players
Lorca FC players
Mérida AD players
Extremadura UD footballers
UD Ibiza players
CD Badajoz players